Kralpora is a  Tehsil and a village in Kupwara district of the Indian administered union territory of Jammu and Kashmir. The village is located just 15 kilometres from district headquarters Kupwara town.

Demographics
According to the 2011 census of India, Kralpora has 569 households. The literacy rate of Kralpora was 66.45% compared to 67.16% of Jammu and Kashmir. In Kralpora, Male literacy stands at 73.92% while the female literacy rate was 57.96%.

Transport

Road
Kralpora is well-connected by road with other places in Jammu and Kashmir and India by the Kupwara-Kralpora Road and Kupwara-Trehgam Road.

Rail
The nearest railway stations to Kralpora are Sopore railway station and Baramulla railway station located at a distance of 56 and 53 kilometres respectively.

Air
The nearest airport is Srinagar International Airport located at a distance of 108 kilometres and is a 3-hour drive.

See also
Kupwara
Gogjigund
Jammu and Kashmir
Lolab Valley
Watter Khani
Drugmulla

References

Cities and towns in Kupwara district